Hugh Drennan Baird Morton, Baron Morton of Shuna (10 April 1930 – 26 April 1995) was a Scottish lawyer, judge. and politician.

Biography 
Born to Scottish missionaries in Mukden, Morton was educated at the Glasgow Academy and Glasgow University, where he read Law, obtaining a First and a Distinction.

Originally a solicitor, he was admitted to the Scottish bar in 1965 and was appointed Queen's Counsel in 1974.  He was a Crown Prosecutor for nearly 10 years, from 1967 to 1971 and from 1974 to 1979.

In 1985, Morton was made a life peer, as Baron Morton of Shuna, of Stockbridge in the District of the City of Edinburgh. He sat on the Labour benches, as Labour's legal affairs spokesman in the House of Lords.

In 1988 he was appointed a Senator of the College of Justice, where he remained critical of the law's failings. In two murder trials, he acquitted the accused on the grounds that there was insufficient evidence to send the case to the jury.

He died of cancer in Edinburgh in 1995.

References 

1930 births
1995 deaths
Morton of Shuna
Scottish solicitors
Morton of Shuna
People educated at the Glasgow Academy
Alumni of the University of Glasgow
Members of the Faculty of Advocates
Scottish King's Counsel
20th-century King's Counsel
Politicians from Shenyang
Deaths from cancer in Scotland
Life peers created by Elizabeth II